Consiglio may refer to:

 Consiglio di Rumo, frazione of the comune of Gravedona ed Uniti, Province of Como, Lombardy, northern Italy 
 Cyprian Consiglio, American composer, musician, Camaldolese monk and Catholic priest
 Douglas Consiglio, Canadian middle-distance runner